The Western States Endurance Run, known commonly as the Western States 100, is a 100.2-mile (161 km) ultramarathon that takes place on California's Sierra Nevada Mountains trails each year on the last full weekend of June. The race starts at the base of the Palisades Tahoe ski resort in Olympic Valley and finishes at the Placer High School track in Auburn, California. The terrain is quite rugged, frequently showcasing snow on the highest passes and record hot temperatures throughout the course. Runners ascend a cumulative total of 18,090 feet (5500 m) and descend a total of 22,970 feet (7000 m) on mountain trails before reaching the finish. Because of the length, the race commences at 5 a.m. and continues through the day and into the night. Runners finishing before the 30-hour time limit for the race receive a commemorative bronze belt buckle, while runners finishing in under 24 hours receive a silver belt buckle.

The Western States 100 is one of the five 100-mile races that comprise the Grand Slam of Ultrarunning, which also includes the Old Dominion 100, Vermont 100 Mile Endurance Run, the Wasatch Front 100 Mile Endurance Run in Utah, and the Leadville Trail 100 in Colorado.

History
The Western States Trail Ride was first completed on foot by seven soldiers from Fort Riley, Kansas during the 1972 event, proving that the mountain course could be marched in less than two days.  In 1974 Gordy Ainsleigh was the first to run it in under 24 hours. Ainsleigh had finished the Western States Trail Ride (Tevis Cup) in 1971 and 1972 on horseback, but in 1973 his new horse was pulled with lameness at the 29-mile checkpoint.  In 1974, with the inspiration and encouragement of Drucilla Barner, the first woman to win the Tevis Cup and Secretary of the Western States Trail Foundation, Gordy joined the horses of the Western States Trail Ride to see if he could complete the course on foot in under 24 hours.  Twenty-three hours and forty-two minutes later Gordy arrived in Auburn, proving that a runner could cover the Western States trail in a day. However, he did not run 100 miles. The course was at most 89 miles until 1980 when it was extended to 93.5 miles and in 1985 finally to 100 miles. Running 100 miles in a day was nothing new. About 1,000 runners worldwide had run or walked 100 miles in a day prior to 1974 on tracks, roads, and trails.

In 1975, Ron Kelley ran the Tevis Cup course along with the horses, and completed 97 miles (157 km) of the course before dropping out.  In 1976, Ken "Cowman" Shirk became the next to complete the course along with the horses, with Ainsleigh pacing him the last 25 miles.

Sixteen runners signed up for the first official Western States Endurance Run in 1977, and started along with the horses in the Tevis Cup.  Thirteen of the 16 had dropped out or were pulled by the midpoint that year.  Of the three remaining runners, only Andy Gonzales finished in the 24-hour time limit set for the horses.  The other two, Peter Mattei and Ralph Paffenbarger, finished in 28 hours and 36 minutes (unofficially), leading to the establishment of the 30-hour bronze buckle time limit for runners.  The Run organization later became its own entity: The Western States Endurance Run Foundation.

The following year, 1978, 63 runners competed and 30 runners finished the first Western States Endurance Run.  The race was held on a separate date, independent of the Tevis Cup Trail Ride. Pat Smythe became the first woman to finish Western States.

As the event grew in notoriety, a lottery system was created in 1981 to allocate the available positions.  A limited number of entries will be reserved to the top two men and the top two women finishers of the five Altra Golden Ticket Series races and the top-ten finishers of the preceding Western States race.  After the few select entries are awarded, a lottery is then held to fill the field from a pool of qualified applicants.  In 2017, a wait list was implemented with replacement runners selected from the wait list to ensure that the 369 allowable starting spots are completely filled.

In 1984, the Granite Chief Wilderness was created under the provisions of the 1964 Wilderness Act, and about four miles (6 km) of the trail were within the new boundaries.  The wilderness designation would normally mean that the Forest Service would not be able to allow organized events in the area.  In 1988, however, the Endurance Run (and the original Trail Ride) was finally given Congressional permission to continue, but with the number of runners limited to 369, the size of the 1984 field.

Results
Tim Twietmeyer, an ultra-marathoner from California completed the race a record 25 times, all in under 24 hours, and winning the race five times.

Scott Jurek's 2005 victory was his seventh consecutive win.

Ann Trason won the women's race fourteen times.

In 2008 the race was canceled due to bad air quality and smoke from an unprecedented number of wildfires.

The 2009 winners of the race were Hal Koerner and Anita Ortiz. In 2010, Geoff Roes overtook Anton Krupicka at the Brown's Bar checkpoint with 10.1 miles to go to win the race and set a new course record with 15:07:04. Tracy Garneau won the women's race in 19:01:55. Amy Palmiero-Winters, a transtibial amputee, became the first amputee in history to complete the race, in 27:43:10.

In 2012, Ellie Greenwood bested the seemingly unbreakable course record set by Ann Trason in 1994 by nearly an hour with a new record time of 16:47:19. The same year, Timothy Olson ran a sub 15 hour race (14:46:44) and in the process, broke the previous course record that was set by Geoff Roes in 2010.

In 2016, Andrew Miller, 20, became the youngest male winner of the Western States 100 after newcomer Jim Walmsley, the forecasted winner, took a wrong turn approaching the north fork of the American River near mile 95.

For the 2018 year, Jim Walmsley broke the course record and ended a streak of failed attempts with a 14:30:04 finish. Jim was reportedly delayed by a few minutes at 95 miles by a mother bear and cubs on the trail.

In 2019, Jim Walmsley broke his own record from 2018 with a time of 14:09:28.

In 2020, the race was canceled due to the COVID-19 pandemic.

Men's Winners

Women's Winners

References

External links 
 Official site of the Western States 100
 The 1977 Western States 100
 The 1978 Western States 100
 Western States 100 – Legends, Myths, and Folklore
 OnTheRunEvents.com - 'The History of the Western States'

Ultramarathons in California
Tourist attractions in Placer County, California
Auburn, California
Ultra-Trail World Tour
Trail running competitions
Ultramarathons in the United States